The 2007 Mohammed bin Rashid International Football Championship, also known as the 2007 Dubai Cup, was a friendly football tournament that took place in Dubai, United Arab Emirates. The 2007 edition took place from 8 till 10 January 2007.

Participant Teams

The four participant teams were clubs from the countries that got to the semi-finals of the preceding year's FIFA World Cup.

  Società Sportiva Lazio
  Olympique de Marseille 
  FC Bayern Munich  
  S.L. Benfica

Bracket

First round

Third place play-off

Final

Goalscorers

2 goals
  Samir Nasri
  Roy Makaay

1 goal

  Djibril Cissé
  Mickaël Pagis
  Andreas Görlitz
  Pasquale Foggia
  Stefano Mauri
  Mark van Bommel
  Stephen Makinwa

See also
Dubai Football Challenge

External links
 Competition official website

Mohammed bin Rashid International Football Championship
2006–07 in Italian football
2006–07 in French football
2006–07 in Portuguese football
2006–07 in German football